Hannah Jane Arterton (born 26 January 1989) is an English actress. She attended Gravesend Grammar School for Girls and graduated from the Royal Academy of Dramatic Art in 2011. She has most notably appeared in the television series The Five (2016) and Safe (2018), and in the film Walking on Sunshine (2014).

Early life
Arterton was born on 26 January 1989 in Gravesend, Kent, England. Her mother Sally-Anne (née Heap) is a cleaner and runs a cleaning business and her father Barry J. Arterton is a metal worker / welder. Her parents divorced during her early childhood with Arterton growing up with her older sister Gemma Arterton and mother in a council estate. She reports being initially drawn to acting at the age of seven after watching a rehearsal of the musical The Wizard of Oz performed by The Miskin Theatre in Dartford. Arterton recalled: "I'd never seen anything like that. I was absolutely blown away... A whole different world just opened up." Her matrilineal great-grandmother was a German-Jewish concert violinist.

Her early education was at the Gravesend Grammar School for Girls. She subsequently studied Performance and Music Technology at North Kent College's Miskin Theatre. While studying there, she provided backing vocals for a skiffle band which resulted in a record deal offer which later collapsed. She commented on the experience: "'Argh, I can't do this. It's too hard to trust people in the music industry. It's full of sharks and guys latching on to a young artist and wanting to make money. I found it all quite scary." A lecturer at The Miskin Theatre subsequently convinced her to apply for the Royal Academy of Dramatic Art (RADA), from which she later graduated in 2011. During her final year at RADA, she was cast by Stephen Poliakoff in his play My City. Also while at RADA, Arterton formed a seven-piece covers band The Hitmen and Her for which she is the lead singer.

Career
After performing in the play, My City (2011) with Tracey Ullman and Tom Riley at the Almeida Theatre, Arterton was then cast as Korinna in the BBC television series Atlantis (2013).

Her feature film debut was as a woman caught in a love triangle in the romantic musical Walking on Sunshine (2014). Her performance received generally positive reviews from critics. In the same year, she starred in Hide and Seek (2014), a romantic drama about a polyamorous commune which received the Edinburgh International Film Festival's award for Best British Feature Film.

In 2016, she played a detective in American crime novelist Harlan Coben's television series The Five. Two years later, Arterton reunited with Coben to play detective Emma Castle in Netflix original series Safe. In the same year, she appeared in two horror films directed by Paul Hyett, The Convent, and Peripheral.

Personal life
Arterton is in a relationship with Chris Hyson, a musician and composer. They live together in South Norwood, London.

Filmography

Television

Film

Radio

Video games

Stage

References

External links

1989 births
Living people
People educated at Mayfield Grammar School
21st-century English actresses
21st-century English women singers
21st-century English singers
Alumni of RADA
English film actresses
English people of Scottish descent
English people of German-Jewish descent
People from Gravesend, Kent